Phyllonorycter bataviella is a moth of the family Gracillariidae. It is known from the United States (Cincinnati, Illinois, Ohio, Maine and Michigan).

The wingspan is 7-7.5 mm.

The larvae feed on Quercus species. They mine the leaves of their host plant.

References

bataviella
Moths of North America
Moths described in 1908

Taxa named by Annette Frances Braun
Lepidoptera of the United States
Leaf miners